Jacqueline de la Baume Dürrbach is a French textile artist. She is best known for having co-created the tapestry of Pablo Picasso's Guernica that hung at the United Nations for thirty-five years.

Early life and education
Born Jaqueline de la Baume, she studied drawing and sculpture at the Académie Julian, Paris. There, she met husband René Dürrbach, who she married around 1949. In 1949 she undertook an apprenticeship in tapestry with Beaudounet in Paris, who was a master of Aubusson tapestry. She dedicated herself entirely to tapestry, making contact with contemporary painters such as Albert Gleizes, Herbin, Léger, Villon and, through their widows, Delaunay and Van Doesburg.

Career
In 1950 de la Baume Dürrbach had her first exhibitions of her tapestries in Paris.

In 1948 she collaborated with Pablo Picasso to create a woven tapestry representing his painting Les Demoiselles d'Avignon. In 1951 they collaborated again, this time to create a tapestry of his 1920 work Pierrot and Harlequin.

In 1955 Picasso, Jaqueline and her husband René Dürrbach worked together to create a tapestry version of Picasso's anti-war painting Guernica. They also jointly created a 3.50 x 7.10 metre gouache painting as a study for the Guernica tapestry.

In 1957 she created a tapestry of Picasso's Deux Harlequins painting.

Collections
Her collaboration with the painter Albert Gleizes is held in the permanent collection of the Denver Art Museum. One of three copies of the Guernica tapestry she made in collaboration with Picasso is included in the collection of the Museum of Modern Art, Gunma, Japan.

References

20th-century French women artists
French textile designers
20th-century women textile artists
20th-century textile artists
20th-century French artists
Académie Julian alumni
Year of birth missing
Year of death missing